Terje Rypdal (born 23 August 1947) is a Norwegian guitarist and composer. He has been an important member in the Norwegian jazz community, and has also given show concerts with guitarists Ronni Le Tekrø and Mads Eriksen as "N3".

Career
Rypdal was born in Oslo, Norway, the son of a composer and orchestra leader. He studied classical piano and trumpet as a child, and then taught himself to play guitar as he entered his teens. Starting out as a Hank Marvin-influenced rock guitarist with The Vanguards, Rypdal turned towards jazz in 1968 and joined Jan Garbarek's group and later George Russell's sextet and orchestra. An important step towards international attention was his participation in the free jazz festival in Baden-Baden, Germany, in 1969, where he was part of a band led by Lester Bowie. During his musical studies at Oslo university and conservatory, he led the orchestra of the Norwegian version of the musical Hair. He has often been recorded on the ECM record label, both jazz-oriented material and classical compositions (some of which do not feature Rypdal's guitar).

His compositions "Last Nite" and "Mystery Man" were featured in the Michael Mann film Heat, and included on the soundtrack of the same name.

Personal
Rypdal was married (1969–1985) to the Norwegian singer Inger Lise Andersen/Rypdal, and they had two children, the auditor Daniel (1970) and the electronica musician Marius (1977). Rypdal was married again in 1988 to Elin Kristin Bergei (born 28 May 1955). They have two children Ane Izabel (1988) and the guitarist Jakob Rypdal (1989). They (as of 2013) live in Tresfjord.

Discography

References

External links 

Terje Rypdal on ECM Records
Notes on the Road Interview with Terje Rypdal

1947 births
Living people
20th-century Norwegian composers
20th-century Norwegian guitarists
20th-century guitarists
20th-century Norwegian male musicians
21st-century Norwegian composers
21st-century Norwegian guitarists
21st-century Norwegian male musicians
Norwegian jazz composers
Norwegian jazz guitarists
Norwegian male guitarists
Norwegian rock guitarists
Avant-garde jazz guitarists
Avant-garde jazz musicians
ECM Records artists
Grappa Music artists
Male jazz composers
Musicians from Oslo
People from Vestnes
Spellemannprisen winners
20th-century jazz composers
21st-century jazz composers